Samar State University (SSU) is a public university in the Philippines located in the province of Samar. Its main campus is located in Barangay Guindaponan, Catbalogan. The university has three other external campuses: Mercedes Campus, Catbalogan; Paranas Campus, and Basey Campus.

The university was first known as Samar State Polytechnic College until it was converted into a university with the merger of Wright Vocational School in Paranas, Samar and Samar Regional School of Fisheries based in Catbalogan.

Samar State University is mandated to provide advanced instruction and professional training in the arts, philosophy, social sciences, agriculture, fishery, forestry, science and technology, engineering, education, law, and other related fields, and also to undertake research and extension services, and provide progressive leadership in its area of specialization.

History
From its humble beginning, the university began in a small one-story small building that only measured 31 meters by 12 meters based on the report by the Philippine Commission. The construction of the building was estimated at ₱19,000 pesos. It was inaugurated in 1912 as Samar Trade School during the incumbency of Governor Vicente Jazmines, serving as the laboratory shop of Samar Provincial High School. It was later converted into an independent secondary trade school. It had it first graduation exercise in 1932.

On June 21, 1959, by virtue of Republic Act No. 2435, the school was converted into Samar School of Arts and Trades, offering a two-year technical curriculum in various vocational areas. It subsequently was given the authority to offer a four-year teacher-education curriculum, Bachelor of Science in Industrial Education (BSIE) and a four-year technical education curriculum, Bachelor of Science in Industrial Technology. It later expanded its programs to evening classes and extension services, and to masters-level instruction.

In 1981, it became one of twenty-three vocational-technical institutes in the Philippines to receive the Asian Development Bank of the Philippines-Vocational Technical (ADV-VOC-TECH) counterpart loan of the MECS in the form of equipment for Automotive, Electronics, Civil and Machine Shop Technology.

In  1982,  Samar School of Arts and Trade was renamed as Samar State Polytechnic College. In October 1999, it merged with Samar Regional School of Fisheries - now the College of Fisheries and Marine Sciences.

In 2003, Republic Act 9313 was passed into law which converted Samar State Polytechnic College into a university and renamed it as Samar State University, incorporating into the system Wright Vocational School in Paranas, Samar.

Campus life
There are numerous clubs and organizations based in the main campus and branches of Samar State University.

Athletics
The university is an active member of the State Colleges and Universities Athletic Association where it plays in the regional level of competition to advance into the national level of the league. It also participates in the Eastern Visayas Regional Athletic Association as among participatings teams from the province of Samar.

Campuses
 Catbalogan
 Guindaponan (Main Campus)
 Mercedes
 Paranas
 Basey
 College of Agriculture and Forestry

Colleges
The university has seven College departments. It offers a variety of courses from secondary to post-graduate studies.
  College of Graduate Studies
  College of Nursing and Health Sciences
  College of Engineering
  College of Education
  College of Arts and Sciences
  College of Industrial Technology and Architecture
  College of Fisheries and Marine Aquatic Sciences (Mercedes Campus)
  Laboratory School

A satellite campus in Basey will be housing the  College of Agriculture and Forestry soon.

Academic programs offered
 College of Graduate Studies
 PhD in Educational Management
 PhD in Technology Management (PhDTM)
 Doctor of Management (DM)
 Master of Arts (MA)
 Master of Arts in Teaching (MAT)
 MA in Education (MAEd)
 MA in Elementary Education (MAEEd)
 Master in Technician Education (MTE)
 Master in Public Management (MPM)
 Master of Engineering (MEng'g) with majors in Water Resources Engineering and Management (WREM), Construction Engineering and Management (CEM), Civil Engineering (CE), Environmental Engineering (EnE) and Engineering Management (EM)
College of Engineering
 Bachelor of Science in Civil Engineering
 Bachelor of Science in Computer Engineering
 Bachelor of Science in Electrical Engineering
 Bachelor of Science in Electronics Engineering
College of Nursing and Health Sciences
 Bachelor of Science in Nursing
 Bachelor of Science in Pharmacy
 Bachelor of Science in Nutrition and Dietetics
College of Education
 Bachelor in Elementary Education
 Bachelor in Secondary Education with Majors in Physics, Chemistry, Biology, English, Math, Physical Education (PE), and Technology, Home Economics (THE), and Social Studies
 Bachelor of Science in Industrial Education
 Bachelor of Science in Technician Education
College of Arts and Sciences
 Bachelor of Science in Applied Statistics
 Bachelor of Science in Information Technology
 Bachelor of Science in Information System
 Bachelor of Science in Psychology
College of Industrial Technology and Architecture
 Bachelor of Science in Architecture
 Bachelor of Science in Industrial Technology
 Bachelor of Technology
 Competency-Based Vocational Education
College of Fisheries and Marine Sciences
 Master of Science in Fisheries Education
 Bachelor of Science in Marine Engineering
 Bachelor of Science in Fisheries
 Bachelor of Secondary Education (Fisheries Education)
 Bachelor of Science in Marine Biology

Media
Since 2010, the university has its own radio station called University Radio 102.9 (DYSY 102.9 MHz).

References

State universities and colleges in the Philippines
Universities and colleges in Samar (province)
Education in Catbalogan
Radio stations in Samar (province)